Carlo J. Caparas' Dugong Buhay (International title: Raging Blood / ) is a Philippine drama television series based on 1983 film of the same name from Viva Films, starring Ejay Falcon and Arjo Atayde. The series aired on ABS-CBN's Kapamilya Gold afternoon block and worldwide on The Filipino Channel from April 8, 2013 to September 27, 2013, replacing Precious Hearts Romances Presents: Paraiso, and was replaced by Galema: Anak ni Zuma.

Plot

Victor Bernabe was honed to become the ultimate weapon of revenge against the De Lara clan. But as he immerses in their world, his mission becomes unclear and he finds a family in the arms of his enemies.

Cast and characters

Main cast
 Ejay Falcon as Victor Bernabe / Gabriel De Lara 
 Arjo Atayde as Rafael De Lara
 Yam Concepcion as Sandy De Guzman

Supporting cast
 Nonie Buencamino as Simon Bernabe
 Lito Pimentel as Pablo De Guzman
 Christian Vasquez as Enrique De Lara
 Ana Capri as Elena Pineda
 Sunshine Cruz as Isabel De Lara
 Ronnie Quizon as Alex De Lara
 Ketchup Eusebio as Christopher "Tope" Bukid
 Jed Montero as Patricia "Trisha" Gonzales

Special participation
 Maliksi Morales as young Simon Bernabe
 Carlo Aquino as young adult Simon Bernabe
 Cajo Gomez as young Enrique De lara
 Ahron Villena as young adult Enrique De Lara
 Pen Medina as Armando Bernabe
 Arthur Acuña as Ramon De Lara
 Valerie Concepcion as Dolores "Dolor" Bernabe
 Jamilla Obispo as young Elena
 Yen Santos as young Isabel
 Lui Villaruz as young Pablo
 Nico Antonio as young Alex
 Brenna Garcia as young Trisha
 Santino Espinoza as Julian Bernabe
 Justin Navarro as young Rafael
 John Vincent Servilla as young Gabriel/Victor

Ratings

See also 
List of programs broadcast by ABS-CBN
List of ABS-CBN drama series

References 

ABS-CBN drama series
2013 Philippine television series debuts
2013 Philippine television series endings
Philippine action television series
Television series about revenge
Television shows based on comics
Live action television shows based on films
Filipino-language television shows
Television shows set in the Philippines